Joan of Valois (1304–1363) was the daughter of Charles, Count of Valois and his second wife Catherine I of Courtenay, titular empress of Constantinople.

She was half-sister to King Philip VI of France. In around 1320, she married Robert III of Artois, Count of Beaumont-le-Roger and seigneur of Conches. They had:
 John of Artois, Count of Eu (1321–1387)
Joan (1323–1324)
James of Artois (c. 1325–1347)
Robert of Artois (c. 1326–1347)
 Charles of Artois, Count of Pézenas (1328–1385)

Her husband Robert III of Artois had attempted to claim the title of Count of Artois, which had been awarded to his aunt Mahaut of Artois, but was condemned and exiled in 1331 for making and presenting forged documents in the process of filing against her. Joan of Valois and her children were therefore imprisoned at Château Gaillard by order of her half-brother King Philip VI.

In fiction
Joan is a character in Les Rois maudits (The Accursed Kings), a series of French historical novels by Maurice Druon.

References

Sources

1304 births
1363 deaths
House of Valois
French princesses